Michael William Romsey Dobson (born 13 May 1952) is a British businessman. He is the chairman and former chief executive (CEO) of Schroders plc, a British multinational asset management company.

Early life
He was educated at Eton and Trinity College, Cambridge.

Career
Dobson has been the chairman of Schroders since April 2016. Previously he served as chief executive of Schroders from November 2001 to April 2016. From 1973 to 2000, he worked at Morgan Grenfell and Deutsche Bank. He served as chief executive at Morgan Grenfell Group from 1989 to 1996 and member of the board of managing directors of Deutsche Bank AG from 1996 to 2000.

His move from CEO to chairman of Schroders was widely criticised, for example in The Independent, "City in uproar as Schroders tycoons flout the rules on good governance".

Dobson serves as the chairman of investment board of the Cambridge University endowment fund and a member of the advisory committee of the staff retirement plan of the International Monetary Fund.

Personal life
He is married with two daughters. He plays tennis and golf, and enjoys skiing and watching Chelsea play football.

References

1952 births
Living people
People educated at Eton College
Alumni of Trinity College, Cambridge
British bankers
British chairpersons of corporations
British chief executives
British corporate directors
Schroders people